Isaac Asimov's The Foundation Trilogy was adapted for the BBC Radio 4 in eight hour-long episodes by Patrick Tull (episodes 1 to 4) and Mike Stott (episodes 5 to 8), directed by David Cain, first broadcast in 1973, and repeated in 1977 and 2002.

Episodes
Originally broadcast in 8 parts, between 6 May and 24 June 1973.

1: Psychohistory and Encyclopedia
The opening episode begins on Trantor, capital of the Galactic Empire, with the meeting of Hari Seldon and Gaal Dornick, their trial, and their exile to Terminus. The action then jumps forward fifty years, to the first Seldon Crisis, where the repercussions of the recent independence of the Four Kingdoms of the Periphery are being felt on Terminus, and are handled by the first Mayor, Salvor Hardin.

2: The Mayors
The scene moves forward a further twenty years, as Mayor Hardin faces down the domination of the nearby and most powerful of the Four Kingdoms, Anacreon, whose ruler intends to annex the Foundation by force.

3: The Merchant Princes
A hundred and fifty years after the Foundation was established, the now powerful trading nation, guided by master trader Hober Mallow, faces its greatest threat to date.

4: The General
Two hundred years after its creation, the Foundation battles Bel Riose, the last powerful General of the dying Galactic Empire.

5: The Mule
A further hundred years have passed, and the Foundation is challenged by an unexpected threat named The Mule.

6: Flight From The Mule
During the war against The Mule, with things going badly for the Foundation, some key figures under the leadership of the Foundation's greatest scientist, Ebling Mis, flee Terminus in search of the Second Foundation, to warn it of the danger from The Mule.

7: The Mule Finds
The Mule attempts to find and overthrow the Second Foundation.

8: Star's End
Sixty years later a teenage girl is at the centre of the Foundation's renewed search for the Second Foundation.

Changes from the novels
 The conflict between The Foundation and Anacreon takes place 70 years into the Foundation era; in the novels it occurs in year 80 F.E.
 A small segment entitled "Traders" in the first volume, Foundation, has been removed entirely
 General editing of the timescale has been done throughout
 A large, rather comedic, section about farming on Rossem has been added to "The Mule Finds"
 The leaders of the Second Foundation are referred to as 'Guardian', rather than 'Speaker' as in the books.

Cast
 Nigel Anthony as Prince Dagobert
 Geoffrey Beevers as Gaal Dornick
 Douglas Blackwell as Onum Barr and The Governor (Rossem)
 Robin Browne as Jaim Twer and Orum Palley
 Heron Carvic as Advocate
 Maurice Denham as Ebling Mis
 William Eedle as Hari Seldon
 Trader Faulkner as Bail Channis
 William Fox as Poly Verisof and Cleon II
 Sarah Frampton as Arkady Darell
 Martin Friend as Ammel Broderig
 Julian Glover as Hober Mallow
 David Gooderson as Tech-man
 Nigel Graham as Franssart
 Brian Haines as Tomaz Sutt and Huxlani
 Michael Harbour as Lathan Devers
 Ronald Herdman as Sennett Forell and Elder (Rossem)
 Ronald Herdman as Lord Dorwin
 Carleton Hobbs as Dr Toran Darell II
 John Hollis as Yohan Lee
 Dinsdale Landen as Bel Riose
 Peter Howell as Ducem Barr
 Anthony Jackson as Jorane Sutt
 Hayden Jones as First trader
 John Justin as Han Pritcher
 Fraser Kerr as Comdor Asper and Meirus
 Michael Kilgarriff as Theo Aporat, Lieutenant Vrank and Tubor
 Rolf Lefebvre as Anselm Rodric and Dagobert IX
 David March as Homir Munn
 Gail MacFarlane as Commdora Licia
 Lee Montague as Salvor Hardin
 Wolfe Morris as Magnifico
 Katherine Parr as Mrs Palver
 Angela Pleasence as Bayta Darell
 Peter Pratt as Lord Stettin
 John Rowe as Jord Fara and Student Planner (Second Foundation)
 John Ruddock as Second trader, Mayor Indbur III and Elder (Rossem)
 John Samson as Sef Sermak
 Prunella Scales as Lady Callia
 Terry Scully as King Lepold I and Oval
 Cyril Shaps - The Guardian/Preem Palver
 William Sleigh as Doktor Walto
 Roy Spencer as Lewis Pirenne
 Lewis Stringer as Randu
 David Valla as Encyclopedia Galactica Read-out
 Gary Watson as Toran Darell
 Peter Williams as Ankor Jael
 Francis de Wolff as Prince Regent Wienis
 Gabriel Woolf as Pelleas Anthor

External links
 Audio files hosted at archive.org
 

Foundation universe
BBC Radio 4 programmes
British science fiction radio programmes
1973 radio programme debuts